Ivan deJesus Valle Velazquez (born 6 January 1980) is a Mexican former professional boxer who competed from 1997 to 2010. He's the former WBC Mundo Hispano featherweight champion.

Professional career
In June 2001, Ivan beat the veteran Jose Luis Mendoza by T.K.O. to win the Mexican National super featherweight title.

On February 28, 2003 Valle lost to Humberto Soto at the Thomas & Mack Center in Las Vegas.

References

External links

Boxers from Sinaloa
Sportspeople from Los Mochis
Lightweight boxers
1980 births
Living people
Mexican male boxers